Levolet may refer to:

 Levothyroxine, a thyroid hormone
 Levofloxacin, a fluoroquinolone antibiotic

Drug brand names